The Buffalo & Erie County Public Library is located on Lafayette Square, Buffalo, New York.  The current facility, designed by Kideney Architects and built in 1964, replaced the original Cyrus Eidlitz Buffalo Public Library Building dedicated in February 1887.  The first Buffalo Public Library, in turn, replaced the Erie County, New York courthouse, which occupied the parcel from 1816-1876.

Founded ca. 1835 as the Young Men's Association (not to be confused with YMCA), prominent members included Samuel Langhorne Clemens, who was the editor of the Buffalo Express from 1869-1871.  The Young Men's Association was a private subscription library, meaning that paid membership was required in order to borrow books.  In 1883, the Association began a fund-raising campaign for a new building and held an architectural competition, which culminated in Eidlitz's 1887 design.  Upon completion, the Association turned over its collections to the citizens of Buffalo and the Buffalo Public Library was born, with no requirement for dues or membership.

Significant library collections include the original, hand-written manuscript of Mark Twain's Adventures of Huckleberry Finn, which Twain donated to the library in 1885; and the Milestones of Science, a collection of first editions announcing major advancements in Western science.

Institutional services

The Institutional Services Division provides library services in three Erie County institutions.

Home Branch Library: Begun in 1956 with only a few books, this library at the Erie County Home has evolved dramatically. Users can now enjoy typical branch services as well as use the program room for coffee hour, old-time radio programs, read-alouds and travel club programs. Magnifying bars, book supports, tape-players, slides, slideviewers and electronic magnifiers are available for those needing special accommodations. Collections such as large print, video and audio cassettes create a warm place to find information or just sit and talk to a friend. For those unable to come to this library, room-to-room cart service to residents is provided.

Correctional Facility Library: This library located within the Erie County Correctional Facility contains both a law library and a general public library. Constructed in 1986, this  library was the first to be built as a core or focal point of a Correctional Facility. Computers are available to inmates for their legal work.

Holding Center Library: Begun in 1969 as cart service to cells, this library has grown to encompass a new facility with both a legal collection and a general library. Residents can borrow all types of materials from adventure fiction to religious non-fiction and use a large legal collection while awaiting trial.

Special collections

The Center for Afro-American History and Research: The Center for Afro-American History and Research is the largest resource center in Western New York for information on African-American history and is located at Frank E. Merriweather Jr. Library. The reference collection includes books, microfilm and pictures with its emphasis on primary source material related to African-American history in Western New York. The "Buffalo Afro-American Collection" is a microfilmed collection, which contains the records of many local organizations as well as the personal papers of community leaders. Records include Urban League, BUILD papers, Bethel A.M.E. Church, First Shiloh, Raphael DuBard's papers and more.

Collection for Persons with Disabilities: For individuals with visual impairments, Niagara Frontier Radio reading service receivers, talking books, print-braille books for children, DVDs with  descriptive narration and large print books are available. A Stand Alone Reading Appliance (SARA)reader, PC workstation with ZoomText Reader 10 software, NVDA screenreader software and table top magnifier are available for public use.  For individuals with hearing impairment, a Sorenson Videophone SVR is available for use by ASL communicators. Assisive listening devices are available for use in the Damon O. Mason Auditorium and at the Ring of Knowledge located on the first floor.

Grosvenor Room: Genealogy, Music, Rare Books: [Pronounced GROVE-ner] This department of Central Library, opened in 1994 as the Special Collections Department, brings together the library's extensive genealogy and local history materials. The Grosvenor Room includes family histories; general and ethnic genealogical research manuals; vital records indexes; passenger lists indexes; church and cemetery records; surname dictionaries; local histories; military rosters; heraldry and family crest dictionaries; and directories of all kinds. In 1995, the Department became the home of the collection of the Western New York Genealogical Society, the region's oldest and largest genealogy organization. Materials from most Grosvenor Room collections are for in-library use only and cannot be borrowed.

Mark Twain Room: This special exhibition room at the Central Library is the home of Twain's original handwritten manuscript, Adventures of Huckleberry Finn. Twain was a briefly a member of the Buffalo and Erie County Public Library's predecessor, the Young Men's Association, and donated the manuscript of what is considered by many to be the greatest American novel. In 1885, Twain sent the second half of Huckleberry Finn, believing the first half had been lost by a printer. In 1991, the missing portion of the manuscript turned up in a small steamer trunk in a Los Angeles attic. It was among the possessions of descendants of James Fraser Gluck, a curator of the Buffalo Library who had requested the manuscript from Twain a century earlier. Eventually, Twain mailed the missing half of the manuscript to Gluck, but Gluck, who apparently took it to have it bound, died with it among his belongings in 1897. After gaining possession, the B&ECPL united the manuscript in 1992 for the first time in over a century. This priceless literary masterpiece is showcased in the heart of the Twain room.

The Mark Twain Room also houses an antique walnut mantel from the now-demolished Delaware Avenue home where Mark Twain lived during his short newspaper career in Buffalo. A framed oil portrait of Twain hangs prominently above this scrupulously restored hardwood mantel. Norman Rockwell prints from a 1940 edition of Huckleberry Finn enhance the walls on either side. Two bookcases feature hundreds of Twain publications, including many first editions and many in foreign languages.  The Mark Twain Room is open during normal Central Library hours of operation.

Area branch libraries

 Alden (Ewell) Free Library - Alden
 Angola Public Library - Angola
 Amherst Main Library at Audubon - Amherst
 Aurora Town Public Library - East Aurora
 Boston Free Library - Boston
 Central Library - Buffalo
 Clarence Public Library - Clarence
 Amherst Public Library, Clearfield Branch - Williamsville
 Collins Public Library - Collins
 Concord Public Library - Springville
 Crane Branch Library - Buffalo
 Dudley Branch Library - Buffalo
 East Clinton Branch Library - Buffalo
 Leroy R. Coles, Jr. Branch Library - Buffalo
 Eden Library - Eden
 Amherst Public Library, Eggertsville-Snyder Branch - Snyder
 Elaine M. Panty Branch Library - Buffalo
 Elma Public Library - Elma
 Grand Island Memorial Library - Grand Island
 Hamburg Public Library, Hamburg Branch - Hamburg
 Isaías González-Soto Branch Library - Buffalo
 Town of Tonawanda Public Library, Kenilworth Branch - Buffalo
 Town of Tonawanda Public Library, Kenmore Branch - Kenmore
 Lackawanna Public Library - Lackawanna
 Hamburg Public Library, Lake Shore Branch - Hamburg
 Lancaster Public Library - Lancaster
 Marilla Free Library - Marilla
 Frank E. Merriweather, Jr. Library - Buffalo
 Newstead Public Library - Akron
 North Collins Library - North Collins
 North Park Branch Library - Buffalo
 Orchard Park Public Library - Orchard Park
 Cheektowaga Public Library, Anna M. Reinstein Memorial Branch - Cheektowaga
 Cheektowaga Public Library, Julia Boyer Reinstein Branch - Cheektowaga
 City of Tonawanda Public Library - City of Tonawanda
 West Seneca Public Library - West Seneca
Amherst Public Library, Williamsville Branch - Williamsville

Notes

External links
Buffalo & Erie County Public Library history

Buildings and structures in Buffalo, New York
Tourist attractions in Buffalo, New York
County library systems in New York (state)
Federal depository libraries
1835 establishments in New York (state)